Madhuri Devi (19 September 1927 – June 1990) was a lead actress in Tamil films from the late 1940s until the 1950s. She has paired opposite leading heroes like M. K. Thyagaraja Bhagavathar and M. G. R and known for acting in the films Manthiri Kumari, Marmayogi, (1951), and Devaki (1951).

Early life
Madhuri Devi was born on 19 September 1927, as Clara, at Royapuram, Madras (Chennai) to Soosai Mudhaliyar, Manoranjidham. Prior to acting in cinema, She stayed North Madras and acted in Christian dramas. She has the ability to act in three roles in the same drama. Madhuri avoided her early cinema opportunities, latterly she agreed to act in the film and change her name Clara to Madhuri Devi.

Career
She entered in Tamil film industry in 1938, her debut film as Ambikapathy (1937). In film Pandurangan (1938), in which she played second heroine. Her next film Lakshmi Vijayam (1947), where she played dual role. She played a comedian in 1940's. Marmayogi (1951), was Madhuri first film with M. G. Ramachandran. Then followed her films that included Mohini, En Thangai, Kanniyin Kaadhali, Ponmudi and Manthiri Kumari. She acted not only as heroine but also played as Vamp and she was comedian in the films Vaayadi (1940) and Poli Panchali (1940). In Kanniyin Kaadhali (1949), where she played three roles in twins Prince Adithyan and Princess Chandrika, later shipwrecked young lady, who disguised as a young man Kalaimani. In the film Ponmudi (1950) starred with P. V. Narasimha Bharathi acted in the film and hired the revdution. She drew applause for her performance as a rich girl in the Sivaji Ganesan starrer Manidhanum Mirugamum (1953). She left cinema around the year 1962, but came back for a guest role in the film Vetri Thirumagal in 1978.

Personal life
She was born as Clara and from a Christian family. Devi married her father's Bengali friend's son Shanti Mukharjee. She died in 1990 after her health suffered a big set back.

Filmography

References

Further reading
 Tamil Cinema’s Female Hero! - Madhuri Devi
 Tamil Actors Bio - in Tamil

External links

Actresses in Tamil cinema
1927 births
1990 deaths